Abdounia minutissima is an extinct species of requiem shark from the Eocene Epoch. It is known from isolated teeth in England, Belgium and possibly the Chespeake Bay region of the eastern United States.

References 

Carcharhinidae
Prehistoric sharks
Fossil taxa described in 1873